Holy Trinity Lutheran Church may refer to:

 Holy Trinity Lutheran Church (Lancaster, Pennsylvania)
 Holy Trinity Lutheran Church (Manhattan)
 Holy Trinity Lutheran Church, Riga